Sumet Promna (born 9 January 1956) is a Thai sprinter. He competed in the men's 100 metres at the 1984 Summer Olympics.

References

1956 births
Living people
Athletes (track and field) at the 1984 Summer Olympics
Sumet Promna
Sumet Promna
Place of birth missing (living people)
Asian Games medalists in athletics (track and field)
Sumet Promna
Athletes (track and field) at the 1982 Asian Games
Medalists at the 1982 Asian Games
Southeast Asian Games medalists in athletics
Sumet Promna
Sumet Promna
Competitors at the 1985 Southeast Asian Games
Sumet Promna
Sumet Promna